V. robusta  may refer to:
 Virgella robusta, a fungus species
 Vriesea robusta, a plant species native to Venezuela

See also
 Robusta (disambiguation)